Lessonia is a genus of large kelp native to the southern Pacific Ocean. It is restricted to the southern hemisphere and is distributed along the coasts of South America, New Zealand, Tasmania, and the Antarctic islands. The genus was first described by Jean Baptiste Bory de Saint-Vincent in 1825.

The genus name of Lessonia is in honour of René Primevère Lesson (1794–1849), who was a French surgeon, naturalist, ornithologist, and herpetologist.

This is one of two principal genera in kelp forests (the other is Macrocystis). In Chile, the preservation of Lessonia kelp is an important to help preserve the biodiversity that exists on rocky shores. By studying the harvesting of these wild populations of Lessonia kelp marine biologists are able to analyze the effects of this activity on wildlife.

In New Zealand there are at least four species that belong to this genus. L. tholiformis is only found on the Chatham Islands. L. adamsiae is only found on the Snares Islands.

Some species are of economic importance, such as Lessonia nigrescens, which is harvested for alginate.

Species 
 Lessonia adamsiae
 Lessonia brevifolia
 Lessonia corrugata
 Lessonia frutescens
 Lessonia nigrescens
 Lessonia searlesiana
 Lessonia tholiformis
 Lessonia trabeculata
 Lessonia vadosa
 Lessonia variegata

References 

 

Laminariales genera